Emma Quintilla Geer Bruton (1907-1989) was a philanthropist and library advocate, the namesake for the Bruton Memorial Library in Plant City, Florida.

Early life
Geer was born in Walton, Kentucky and moved to Florida in 1923. She graduated from Plant City High School as valedictorian in 1926 and attended Tampa Business College and Brewster Vocational School. She married James Bruton Jr. in Tampa, Florida in 1932, he worked as a county judge. The two of them purchased 50 acres of land northwest of Plant City, Florida and named it Audubon Acres and created a bird and wildlife sanctuary. Bruton was president of Woman's Club of Plant City, and when Interstate 4 was built through the middle of Audubon Acres, she turned her attentions to library advocacy.

Library advocacy
As chairman of the Plant City's Woman's Club, Bruton started the Plant City library, and then went on to develop the countywide library in Hillsborough County.  She set up the county's first library board and served as committee's chairman on that board for 12 years. The Tampa library was built in 1960 during her tenure, as well as many satellite branches, including Ruskin, Brandon and Ybor City. Prior to 1960, Tampa's only library was a 2000 volume collection in a former house to serve a city of over 100,000 people. Bruton served on the Florida State Library Board from 1961 to 1969 and as the board's chairman in 1961 and 1962. For her work with library advocacy she received the Book of the Month Club's Dorothy Canfield Fisher Library award for Florida on behalf of the Plant City Public Library in 1963.

Legacy
Bruton was a founder of the East Hillsborough Historical Society, which maintains the Quintilla Geer Bruton Archives Center. The Plant City public library was named the Quintilla Geer Bruton Memorial Library between 1989 and 1994 when the name was changed to the Bruton Memorial Library to encompass the contributions of both her and her husband. She and her husband gave $1.13 million to the University of South Florida for their law center with money they raised selling Audubon Acres in 1982. Her papers are held  at the Special Collections Department at the University of South Florida.

Works
 Plant City: Its Origin and History. Plant City, L: East Hillsborough Historical Society, 1984. With David E Bailey.

References

1907 births
1989 deaths
20th-century American philanthropists
Clubwomen
People from Plant City, Florida
People from Walton, Kentucky